Steven Feifke (born June 21, 1991 in Lexington, Massachusetts) is an American jazz pianist, composer, orchestrator, and arranger.

Early life and education 
Feifke attended Lexington High School and the New England Conservatory of Music Preparatory School. He attended NYU where he received a degree in Jazz Studies and Economics. He obtained a Master of Music in Jazz Composition from the Manhattan School of Music.

Musical career 
He has played with Chad Lefkowitz Brown, Steve Tyrell, Santino Fontana, Randy Brecker, Benny Benack III, Bryan Carter, and Alexa Tarantino.

Feifke lectured on orchestration and harmony at Yale University. He developed a curriculum which integrated the American civil rights movement with jazz pedagogy for Arts Mid-Hudson. Feifke also served as a Guest Artist-in-Residence at Moravian College. Feifke serves on the faculty for The New School for Jazz and Contemporary Music and Berklee College of Music.

Competitions 
Feifke is a Winner of the David Baker Prize of the Ravinia Music Festival, Second Place in the BMI Foundation Charlie Parker Jazz Composition Prize, and has twice been a semi-finalist in the Thelonious Monk Jazz Competition.

Composition 
As a composer and orchestrator, he has written for artists such as Danny Janklow, Michael Dease, Ulysses Owens, Chris Norton, and Chad Lefkowitz-Brown. Feifke's debut album Peace in Time was released in 2015 featuring artists such as Andrew Gould and Jimmy Macbride.

Feifke has written original works for television and film media; his music can be heard on an episode of Jerry Seinfeld’s hit Netflix show “Comedians in Cars Getting Coffee” featuring former President Barack Obama. Feifke was commissioned by Catskill Jazz Factory to compose an orchestral piece that debuted at the New Generation Festival in Florence, Italy.

Endorsements 
Feifke is a Yamaha Performing Artist.

Discography

As leader

As sideman

References 

Living people
1991 births